The 2003 Mr. Olympia contest was an IFBB professional bodybuilding competition held October 22–26, 2003 at the Mandalay Bay Arena in Las Vegas, Nevada.

Results

For the fifth year in a row, the total prize money for the Mr. Olympia weekend was increased, reaching a level of $404,000 with the winner taking home $110,000 and a Cadillac Escalade provided by Pinnacle Supplements.

Notable events

Ronnie Coleman won his sixth consecutive Mr. Olympia title
Chris Cormier pulled out of the Olympia due to sickness, although he was at the press conference
Art Atwood and Kevin Levrone both competed despite experiencing injuries during their training
Arnold Schwarzenegger made a special guest appearance 
Franco Columbu received two special awards from the IFBB and was quoted "I'm happy that I got two awards and Arnold got nothing"
Lee Haney, the man who broke Arnold's record of seven Mr. Olympia titles received a special lifetime achievement award from the IFBB and FLEX Magazine

See also
 2003 Ms. Olympia

References

External links 
 Mr. Olympia

 2003
2003 in American sports
Mr. Olympia 2003
2003 in bodybuilding